Sadat may refer to:
 Sadat, Gilan
 Sadat, Ilam
 Sadat, Isfahan
 Sadat, Abadan, Khuzestan Province
 Sadat, Ahvaz, Khuzestan Province
 Sadat-e Mohammad Ebrahim, Izeh County, Khuzestan Province
 Sadat-e Nejat (disambiguation)
 Sadat, Khorramshahr, Khuzestan Province
 Sadat-e Hayat Gheyb, Masjed Soleyman County, Khuzestan Province
 Sadat-e Bakhat Najat, Shush County, Khuzestan Province
 Sadat Fazel-e Do, Shush County, Khuzestan Province
 Sadat Fazel-e Seh, Shush County, Khuzestan Province
 Sadat, Kohgiluyeh and Boyer-Ahmad
 Sadat, Boyer-Ahmad, Kohgiluyeh and Boyer-Ahmad Province
 Sadat, Razavi Khorasan
 Sadat Rural District, in Lali County, Khuzestan Province